The Castle of Andalusia is a 1782 comic opera by Samuel Arnold and a libretto by John O'Keeffe. It was a heavily rewritten version of the 1781 work The Banditti, which had been a failure.

After its first performance on 2 November 1782, the original run saw the work performed thirty-nine times, and it was revived on several occasions until 1817. It became a popular play for amateur dramatics and was performed by the Kilkenny players, including many of the elite, with the writer Thomas Moore appearing several times in the role of Spado.

References

Bibliography
 Fenner, Theodore: Opera in London: Views of the Press, 1785-1830 (Carbondale, Illinois: Southern Illinois University Press, 1994)
 Kelly, Ronan: Bard of Erin: The Life of Thomas Moore (London: Penguin Books, 2009)
 White, Eric Walter: A Register of First Performances of English Operas (London: Society for Theatre Research, 1983)

External links
 

1782 operas
English comic operas
Operas set in the British Isles
Plays by John O'Keeffe